Andy Desmond, now known as Miten, (born in August 1947 in Woking, Surrey) is a British musician known throughout the Yoga and Alternative Healing community for his songs of redemption and transformation. He travels creating meditative evenings of mantra and song to millions of devotees around the world.

Background
Desmond founded the folk/rock duo Gothic Horizon with musical partner Richard Garrett in the late 1960s. The band released two albums on UK Argo : The Jason Lodge Poetry Book ( 1971 ) and Tomorrow's Another Day (1972 )

In 1973, Desmond began performing solo and became part of a stable of folk musicians which included Tom Robinson, Claire Hamill and Café Society, who were signed by Ray Davies to his record label Konk Records. Desmond subsequently released Living On A Shoestring on Konk, featuring members of The Kinks and produced by Dave Davies and a fellow Kink member, keyboardist John Gosling.

During this time Desmond became established in the UK as a singer/songwriter of note and was subsequently signed to Ariola Records in London. Ariola released Andy Desmond in 1976 - an album containing 10 self composed songs, produced by legendary Los Angeles producer Bones Howe.

At the time of its release Desmond had become a stalwart on the British rock scene, opening for Fleetwood Mac, Randy Newman, Hall and Oates, The Cate Brothers, The Kinks and many others.  He was invited by Fleetwood Mac to be their special guest on their UK Rumours Tour, and opened for Ry Cooder on his 1978 European tour.

Disillusioned with the rock world and his destructive life style, Desmond went on to explore meditation and Eastern philosophy. He was initiated into ‘sannyas’ in 1980 by controversial Indian mystic Bhagwan Shree Rajneesh and given the Sanskrit name Prabhu Miten meaning 'Friend of God'. He spent many years in India at Osho's ashram in Pune, recording and producing the album 'In Wonder' - a tribute to his Guru and spiritual guide. It was during this time Desmond met record producer John Leckie who, in the ashram, was known as 'Nagara'. The two became lifelong friends, resulting in many collaborations, most notably on the album 'Blown Away' for Prabhu Music. From 1992, German New Age Label, Tao Music (later New Earth Records) released three albums with Desmond titled Heartbeat, Shadow of Light and Tidal Wave.

Desmond now tours the world with his musical and life partner, Deva Premal, whom he met in India at Osho's ashram in 1990. The couple, known as Deva Premal & Miten, are well known in the world of alternative spirituality and yoga for their chanting of Indian Sanskrit mantras and for Desmond’s spiritually inspired songs. Yoga International featured the duo in a 2009 article on Yoga Rock Stars: "They are the Johnny and June Carter Cash of sacred music, with more than a dozen albums and a fan base that includes both Cher and the Dalai Lama." They have collaborated with motivational speaker Anthony Robbins, best selling author Eckhart Tolle, and rock icon Cher, who covered their version of the ancient prayer  The Gayatri Mantra on her Farewell Tour in 2002.

Deva & Miten's record company, Prabhu Music, reports CD sales in excess of one million, and the couple travel the world continually with Nepalese bansuri maestro Manose, playing up to 25 countries in the space of a year.

Discography
 The Jason Lodge Poetry Book (Gothic Horizon ), UK Argo 1971
 Tomorrow's Another Day (Gothic Horizon ), UK Argo 1972
 Living On A Shoestring, Konk 1975
 Andy Desmond, Ariola Records, 1976
 Global Heart, Native Soul (1996)
 Strength of A Rose (with Deva Premal) (1996)
 Trusting the Silence (with Deva Premal) (1997)
 Blown Away (1999)
 Dance of Life (1999)
 Satsang (Deva Premal & Miten) (2002)
 Songs for the Inner Lover (with Deva Premal) (2003)
 More Than Music (Deva Premal & Miten) (2004)
 Soul In Wonder (with Deva Premal) (2007)
 Download Singles (with Deva Premal) (2009)
 Deva Premal & Miten In Concert (Deva Premal & Miten with Manose) (2009)
 Deva Premal & Miten with Manose - A Deeper Light (April 2013) co-produced with Joby Baker and Maneesh de Moor
 Temple at Midnight (2016)

Producer
 Deva Premal - The Essence (exec producer) (1998)
 Deva Premal - Love is Space (co-producer with Kit Walker) (2000)
 Deva Premal - Embrace (co-producer with Kit Walker) (2002)
 Deva Premal - Dakshina (co-producer with Martyn Phillips and Praful) (2005)
 Deva Premal - Deva Premal Sings the Moola Mantra (co-producer with Ben Leinbach) (2007)
 Deva Premal - Password (co-producer with Rishi) (Oct 2011)
 Deva Premal & Miten with Manose - A Deeper Light (April 2013) co-produced with Joby Baker and Maneesh de Moor

References

External links 
 

British folk rock groups
British world music musicians
New-age musicians
Living people
1947 births